An endangered language is a language that it is at risk of falling out of use, generally because it has few surviving speakers. If it loses all of its native speakers, it becomes an extinct language. UNESCO defines four levels of language endangerment between "safe" (not endangered) and "extinct":
 Vulnerable
 Definitely endangered
 Severely endangered
 Critically endangered

Central America (Spanish: Centroamérica or América Central) is a central geographic region of the Americas.  It is variably defined either as the southern portion of North America, which connects with South America on the southeast, or as a region of the American continent in its own right.

References 

Central America
Endangered languages